Novosphingobium sediminicola  is a Gram-negative, short rod-shaped, non-spore-forming and non-motile bacterium from the genus Novosphingobium which has been isolated from freshwater sediments from the Lake Hakha in Korea.

References

External links
Type strain of Novosphingobium sediminicola at BacDive -  the Bacterial Diversity Metadatabase	

Bacteria described in 2011
Sphingomonadales